Grijalva may refer to

Places 
The Grijalva River in Mexico
Juan del Grijalva, Chiapas, town in Mexico

People 
Axel Grijalva, Mexican professional footballer
Gonzalo Abad Grijalva, Ecuadorian educator
Jesus Zambrano Grijalva, Mexican politician
Juan de Grijalva, Spanish explorer
Lucila Villaseñor Grijalva, United States artist
Luis Grijalva, United States long distance runner
Raúl Grijalva, United States politician
Ruben Grijalva, former California civil servant
Tracy Grijalva, United States heavy-metal guitarist